William Claire Halley Harding (November 13, 1904 – April 1, 1967) was an American Negro league shortstop from 1926 to 1937.

A native of Wichita, Kansas, Harding attended Knox College and Wilberforce University, where he was a standout football quarterback and punter. He played professional basketball for the Harlem Rens, and made his Negro league baseball debut in 1926 for the Indianapolis ABCs.

Following his baseball career, Harding worked as a sportswriter and editor for the Los Angeles Tribune and the Los Angeles Sentinel, and was a leading voice in advocating for the integration of the Los Angeles Rams and the National Football League. He died in Chicago, Illinois in 1967 at age 62.

References

External links
 and Baseball-Reference Black Baseball stats and Seamheads

1904 births
1967 deaths
American sportswriters
Baltimore Black Sox players
Detroit Stars players
Indianapolis ABCs players
Kansas City Monarchs players
Philadelphia Stars players
Baseball shortstops
Baseball players from Wichita, Kansas
20th-century African-American sportspeople